Reginald Westwood (19 October 1907 – 4 May 1980) was a New Zealand cricketer. He played in three first-class matches for Canterbury in 1940/41.

See also
 List of Canterbury representative cricketers

References

External links
 

1907 births
1980 deaths
New Zealand cricketers
Canterbury cricketers
People from Foxton, New Zealand